Calliprason sinclairi, Sinclair's longhorn, is a longhorn beetle species in the genus Calliprason. It is endemic to New Zealand. Sinclair's longhorn was named for Dr. Andrew Sinclair who found the insect in New Zealand, and presented it, with many other New Zealand insects, to the British Museum.

Description 
Sinclair's longhorn is a small beetle, with distinctive green iridescent elytra. Males measure 8.5–10.4 mm, and females measure 9.7–12.9 mm.

Distribution and habitat 
Calliprason sinclairi is widely distributed throughout the North Island, and has been documented in Northland, Auckland, Coromandel, Bay of Plenty, Taupo and Wellington. It is also found in the northern part of the South Island, specifically Nelson, Marlborough Sounds, and Mid Canterbury. The grubs burrow into dead and decaying wood, especially branches of pigeonwood (Hedycarya arborea) and miro (Podocarpus ferrugineus). They are common around forests from December, January, and into February.

References 

Beetles of New Zealand
Beetles described in 1843
Endemic fauna of New Zealand
Taxa named by Adam White (zoologist)
Stenoderini
Endemic insects of New Zealand